Gensi may refer to:

 Gensi, Lower Siang, Arunachal Pradesh, India; a town
 Gensi Township (根思乡), Taixing, Taizhou, Jiangsu, China; a township; see List of township-level divisions of Jiangsu
 Yang Gensi (1922-1950; 杨根思) Chinese war hero of the Korean War
 Twin Gensi (双幻士 Sōgenshi), fictional characters from Juken Sentai Gekiranger, see List of Juken Sentai Gekiranger characters

See also

 Gensis (disambiguation)